Prince Pyotr Vladimirovich Dolgorukov (1816–1868) was a Russian historian and journalist known for his genealogical research and as a critic of the Imperial Russian government. His father was the general Vladimir Petrovich Dolgorukov.

Life 
Dolgorukov was known for his anti-government publications. He moved to Paris in 1859 and refused to return to Russia.

As a result, he was deprived by the authorities of all titles and property, and declared a permanent exile. After Dolgorukov's death, his archives were acquired by the Russian government.

Some of Dolgorukov's chief works include:
 "Российский родословный сборник" (“Russian Genealogical Collection”; St. Petersburg, 1840–41),
 "Сведения о роде князей Долгоруковых" (“Accounts about the Princely House of Dolgorukov”, 1842),
 Notices sur les principales familles de la Russie, par le c-te Almagro (Paris, 1842),
 "Российская родословная книга" (“Russian Genealogical Book”, 1855–57),
 La vérité sur la Russie (Paris, 1860),
 "De la question du servage en Russie" (Paris, 1860),
 "Le general Ermolow" (1861),
 "Des reformes en Russie, suivi d'un aperçu sur les états généraux russes au XVI et au XVII s." (1862),
 "Михаил Николаевич Муравьев" (“Mikhail Nikolayevich Muravyov”; St. Petersburg, 1864),
 "Memoires" (Geneva-Basel, 1867–71).

References 
 Долгоруков. Russian Biographic Lexicon.

1816 births
1868 deaths
Russian political activists
Russian genealogists
Journalists from the Russian Empire
Male writers from the Russian Empire
Pyotr
19th-century journalists from the Russian Empire
Russian male journalists
19th-century male writers from the Russian Empire